Pycnochromis acares is a species of damselfish native to the Pacific Ocean.

Distribution and habitat
They are found in reefs and sometimes lagoons throughout the Pacific Ocean. It ranges from the Japan to Hawaii, Vanuatu, and the Austral Islands.

Description
They are white with a yellow blotch that extends from the eye to the pectoral fin. Its dorsal and caudal fins are yellow.

Ecology

Diet
Pycnochromis acares is an omnivorous species of fish.

Behavior
This species of damselfish occurs in big to small aggregations above coral heads or rubble.

In the aquarium
In the aquarium trade, this species of fish is uncommon.

References

External links
 

acares
Fish described in 1973